The 2018 Boston Marathon was the 122nd running of the Boston Athletic Association's Boston Marathon. It took place on Monday, April 16, 2018 (Patriots' Day in Massachusetts). Yuki Kawauchi won the men's foot race in 2:15:58 and Desiree Linden won the women's foot race in 2:39:54. The previous year's times were 2:09:37 and 2:21:52, respectively, reflecting the difficult running conditions this year. Wheelchair winners were Marcel Hug, 1:46:26, and Tatyana McFadden, 2:04:39.

Course 
The event ran along the same winding course the Marathon has followed for many decades: 26 miles, 385 yards (42.195 km) of roads and city streets, starting in Hopkinton and passing through six Massachusetts cities and towns, to the finish line beside the Boston Public Library, on Boylston Street in Boston's Copley Square. There was rain and hail throughout the day, heavy at times, with temperatures in the 40s F and gusty winds.

Results 
Results reported by the Boston Globe, and the BAA.

Wheelchair

References

External links 

 Official website

Boston Marathon
Boston
Boston Marathon
Boston Marathon
Boston Marathon
Marathon